The Moxy Portland Downtown, often referred to as simply the Moxy Hotel, is a 12-story, 197-room hotel in Portland, Oregon. The Moxy brand is operated by Marriott International. The building was designed by DLR Group for Graves Hospitality.

Justin Sutherland opened the sandwich shop Big E in the hotel in 2022.

References

External links
 
 

Hotels in Portland, Oregon
Marriott International
Southwest Portland, Oregon